"S-S-S-Single Bed" is a song by British-based pop group Fox from their third album Blue Hotel. Written and produced by the group's founder Kenny Young, it became their third and final hit on the UK Singles Chart in May 1976, spending 10 weeks on the chart and reaching a peak of number four. It marked a return to success for Fox, whose second album Tails of Illusion and its single "Strange Ships" had failed to chart. The song was most successful in singer Noosha Fox's native Australia, where it reached number one for four weeks in August 1976.

The song features suggestive lyrics, sung from the perspective of a lady addressing a man who has missed the last train home, warning him "All I've got is a single bed / there ain't no room for your sweet head". Speaking in 1976, Noosha Fox said she considered the song musically the best thing the band had done, describing it as understated. Writing in a review of Cherry Red's The Fox Box for Louder Than War in 2017, Ian Canty described the song as a "submerged but tight funk/reggae backing track with a great hook-line complementing the cool, sultry vocal".

In stage performances the backing singer would use a talk box to produce a distorted effect for the verse ''Baby don't cry
Bye bye baby
Baby don't cry
Bye bye baby''

Other recordings 
In 2009, Bananarama released their version of the song on their album Viva.

Charts

Weekly charts

Year-end charts

References

1975 songs
1976 singles
British pop songs
GTO Records singles
Number-one singles in Australia
Songs written by Kenny Young